Atticus is a masculine name of Greek origin meaning “from Attica.”   The name is often used in reference to Atticus Finch, a heroic lawyer who represents an African American man accused of rape by a white woman in a racist Southern United States town in Harper Lee’s 1960 novel To Kill a Mockingbird. Usage of the name continued to increase even after the publication of the 2015 sequel Go Set a Watchman, a novel which presents a more conflicted version of Atticus Finch who also holds racist beliefs.  The name has been steadily increasing in usage in the United States. It has been among the top 1,000 names for boys in the United States since 2004 and among the top 300 since 2020.

People 
 Titus Pomponius Atticus (112/109 – 35/32 BC), ancient Roman littérateur, philosopher, and correspondent with Cicero
 Herodes Atticus (101–177), Greek rhetorician
 Atticus (philosopher) (fl. c. 175), Platonist philosopher and author of lost Plato commentary
 Atticus, Christian martyr, one of Agapius, Atticus, Carterius, Styriacus, Tobias, Eudoxius, Nictopolion, and Companions (d. 310)
 Atticus of Constantinople (406–425) 
 Atticus Greene Haygood (1839–1896), Methodist bishop and president of Emory University
 Atticus Ross (born 1968), English musician
 Atticus Browne (born 1991), West Indian cricketer
 Atticus Mitchell (born 1993), Canadian actor and musician
 Atticus Shaffer (born 1998), American actor

Fictional people 
 Atticus, a character in Cicero's De Legibus
 Atticus, a character in The 39 Clues series of young adult novels
 Atticus Aldridge, a character in the television series Downton Abbey
 Atticus Fetch, a character in the television series Californication
 Atticus Finch, a central character in the novel To Kill a Mockingbird
 Atticus Kodiak, a character in novels by Greg Rucka
 Sir Atticus Moon, a character in Big Time Movie
 Atticus Murphy Jr., a character in the television series Todd and the Book of Pure Evil
 Atticus O'Sullivan, the main character of the novel series The Iron Druid Chronicles
 Atticus Rhodes, a character in the English dub of the Japanese anime Yu-Gi-Oh! GX
 Atticus Lincoln, a character in the television series Grey's Anatomy
 Atticus Turner, a character in the novel Lovecraft Country
 Atticus Freeman, a character in the television series Lovecraft Country
 Atticus Busby, a character in the Australian the television series Little Lunch

Notes